Ranalisma is a genus in the family Alismataceae.  It includes two species; one from tropical Africa and the other from southeast Asia.

Species

 Ranalisma humile (Rich. ex Kunth) Hutch. in J.Hutchinson & J.M.Dalziel - from Senegal to Tanzania, south to Zambia and Angola
 Ranalisma rostrata Stapf. - China (Hunan, Jiangxi, Zhejiang), Vietnam, Malaysia, India

References

Alismataceae
Alismataceae genera